André Bosman (born 20 January 1965 in Maarn) is a Dutch politician and former officer, flight instructor and aviator. As a member of the People's Party for Freedom and Democracy (Volkspartij voor Vrijheid en Democratie) he had been an MP from 17 June 2010 until 31 March 2021. He focused on matters of the Dutch defense and Kingdom relations.

Among others he was liaison officer at ISAF headquarters in Kabul in 2006.

References
  Parlement.com biography

External links 
  André Bosman personal website
  House of Representatives biography
  People's Party for Freedom and Democracy biography

1965 births
Living people
Members of the House of Representatives (Netherlands)
People from Maarn
People's Party for Freedom and Democracy politicians
Royal Netherlands Air Force officers
Royal Netherlands Air Force pilots
21st-century Dutch politicians
Dutch flight instructors